Jafarabad-e Olya (also Romanized as Ja‘farābād-e ‘Olyā; also known as Ja‘farābād, Ja‘farābād Bāla, Ja‘farābād-e Bālā, and Ja‘farābād-e Morzeh Qolī Khān) is a village in Baghestan Rural District, in the Central District of Bavanat County, Fars Province, Iran. At the 2006 census, its population was 460, in 126 families.

References 

Populated places in Bavanat County